Hen and chicks, Hen and chicken or Hen and chickens can refer to
 Hen and chicks, a group of plants
 Hen and Chicken Bay, Sydney, Australia
 Hen and chicken fern, a plant (Asplenium bulbiferum)
 Hen and Chicken Islands, New Zealand
 Hen and Chicken Islands (Raquette Lake), New York state, USA
 Hen and chicken plant, when they tend to reproduce vegetatively by plantlets
 Hen and Chickens (reef), Florida, USA
 Hen and Chickens Shoal Light, Florida, USA
 Hen and Chickens Theatre, London, UK